The 2022 JC Ferrero Challenger Open was a professional tennis tournament played on clay courts. It was the fifth edition of the tournament which was part of the 2022 ATP Challenger Tour. It took place in Alicante, Spain between 3 and 9 October 2022.

Singles main-draw entrants

Seeds

 1 Rankings are as of 26 September 2022.

Other entrants
The following players received wildcards into the singles main draw:
  Dali Blanch
  Ulises Blanch
  Martín Landaluce

The following players received entry into the singles main draw as alternates:
  Robin Haase
  Billy Harris

The following players received entry from the qualifying draw:
  Bu Yunchaokete
  Steven Diez
  Federico Gaio
  Hady Habib
  Rudolf Molleker
  Stuart Parker

Champions

Singles

  Lukáš Klein def.  Nick Hardt 6–3, 6–4.

Doubles

  Robin Haase /  Albano Olivetti def.  Sanjar Fayziev /  Sergey Fomin 7–6(7–5), 7–5.

References

2022 ATP Challenger Tour
2022 in Spanish tennis
October 2022 sports events in Spain